Marcus Motier Drake (1835–1907) was Mayor of the City of Buffalo, New York, serving during November - December 1882, after the resignation of Grover Cleveland. He was born in DeRuyter, New York on September 7, 1835.  When two years old, the family moved near Fredonia, New York.  He graduated from Fredonia Academy in 1852. In 1861, he was made a captain and given command of the "Genesee Chief" steamer. In August 1862, enlisted in the Union Army at Dunkirk, New York and entered as a private in the 72d Regiment, N.Y. Volunteers. In the spring of 1865, his term ended and he was transferred to 120th Regiment, NY Volunteers. Upon his transfer he was promoted to the rank of 1st Lieutenant and placed in command of Company H, which was present at the surrender at Appomattox. In 1872, he was appointed Superintendent of the Union Dry Dock Company, upon its organization.  In 1860, he married Persis L. Bennett of Hamlet, New York, who died soon after their marriage. In 1867, he remarried with Mary A. Ludlow; she died in 1880 and he married Lillian Quest in 1900. 

In the fall of 1878, he was elected Alderman for the Eleventh Ward. Upon the resignation of Grover Cleveland as mayor on November 20, 1882 to take the Governor's seat, the Common Council elected Drake to fill the vacancy until a special election could be held in early January 1883.  He resigned on December 22, 1882, to take effect on December 29, 1882, in order to return to his newly elected duties as alderman. He retired from the Board of Aldermen in 1890. In 1895, under Mayor Edgar B. Jewett, he was made Commissioner of Public Works, a position he held from January 1896 until December 1900. During his commissionership, a giant boulder was placed in the meadow of Delaware Park, marking the burial site of 300 unknown soldiers of the War of 1812. He died on September 28, 1907, and was buried in Forest Lawn Cemetery.

References

1835 births
1907 deaths
Mayors of Buffalo, New York
Burials at Forest Lawn Cemetery (Buffalo)
State University of New York at Fredonia alumni
New York (state) Republicans